Merry-Go-Round of 1938 is a 1937 American comedy film directed by Irving Cummings and written by Monte Brice and A. Dorian Otvos. The film stars Bert Lahr, Jimmy Savo, Billy House, Alice Brady, Mischa Auer, Joy Hodges, Louise Fazenda, John 'Dusty' King and Barbara Read. The film was released on November 14, 1937, by Universal Pictures.

Plot

Cast        
Bert Lahr as Bert
Jimmy Savo as Jimmy
Billy House as Billy
Alice Brady as Aunt Hortense
Mischa Auer as Mischa
Joy Hodges as Sally Brown
Louise Fazenda as Mrs. Penelope Updike
John 'Dusty' King as Tony Townsend 
Barbara Read as Clarice Stockbridge
Dave Apollon as Dave Apollon 
Richard Carle as Col. J. Addison Frooks
Howard Cantonwine as Hector
Charles Williams as Dave Clark
Joyce Kay as Sally
Fay Helm as Dainty Doris
John Kelly as Bus Driver
Beverly Ann Welch as Trap drummer

References

External links
 

1937 films
1930s English-language films
American comedy films
1937 comedy films
Universal Pictures films
Films directed by Irving Cummings
American black-and-white films
1930s American films